Oswaldo Handro (1908–1986) was a Brazilian botanist who specialized in pteridophytes and spermatophytes. The genus Handroanthus was named for him.

References

1908 births
1986 deaths
20th-century Brazilian botanists